"Here I Am" (also titled as "Here I Am (Just When I Thought I Was Over You)") is a song written and first recorded by Norman Saleet and released as a single in 1980 on RCA Records. It was recorded the following year by the British/Australian soft rock duo Air Supply and released as the second single from their sixth studio album The One That You Love.

Background
"Here I Am" was written by singer-songwriter Norman Saleet who released it as a single in 1980, backed with "This Time I Know It's Real". Both songs appear on Saleet's 1982 sole studio album Here I Am.

In 1981, Air Supply released their version which was a top 5 hit in the US. To prevent confusion, the song was originally released as "Here I Am" on the LP but was re-titled "Here I Am (Just When I Thought I Was Over You)" for the release of the single, so as not to be confused with the group's No. 1 hit song "The One That You Love" earlier in the year which contains the lyrics: "Here I am, the one that you love." Lead vocals on "Here I Am (Just When I Thought I Was Over You)" were performed by the two vocalists in the group, Graham Russell and Russell Hitchcock. Record World described it as an "elegantly harmonized ballad."

Chart performance
Air Supply's version was released as a single in the fall of 1981, and peaked at No. 5 on the Billboard Hot 100 chart in November of that year, remaining in the top 40 for 15 weeks. The song also spent three weeks atop the Billboard Adult Contemporary chart.

Charts

Weekly charts

Year-end charts

Reception
Reviewing a live performance of the song in 2013 for The Paris Review, Robin Hemley described it as sounding "kind of like Every Other Song in the World to Me".

Personnel
Russell Hitchcock - vocals
Graham Russell - vocals, guitar

See also
List of number-one adult contemporary singles of 1981 (U.S.)

References

1980 songs
1980 singles
1981 singles
Air Supply songs
Norman Saleet songs
Songs written by Norman Saleet
Song recordings produced by Harry Maslin
Arista Records singles
RCA Records singles
1980s ballads